Callophrys lanoraieensis, the bog elfin, is a species of Lycaenidae that is native to North America.

Description
It is a dull brown and tailless.

The caterpillars eat black spruce (Picea mariana).

Range
They range from eastern New Hampshire through coastal Maine north to New Brunswick. Isolated populations in eastern Ontario, southern Quebec, Nova Scotia, and Maine, and rare in New York and Massachusetts. Within this range they tend to black spruce and tamarack bogs.

Similar species
 Eastern pine elfin (C. niphon)

References

Callophrys
Butterflies of North America
Butterflies described in 1934